The 1959–60 season was Newport County's second consecutive season in the Football League Third Division. It was their 31st season in the third tier and 32nd season overall in the Football League.

Season review

Results summary

Results by round

Fixtures and results

Third Division

FA Cup

Welsh Cup

League table

External links
 Newport County 1959-1960 : Results
 Newport County football club match record: 1960
 Welsh Cup 1959/60

References

 Amber in the Blood: A History of Newport County. 

1959-60
English football clubs 1959–60 season
1959–60 in Welsh football